Fei Tsui is one of the 35 constituencies in the Eastern District. The constituency returns one district councillor to the Eastern District Council, with an election every four years. Since its creation in the 1994 election, the seat was last held by Joseph Lai Chi-keong who was the member of the Democratic Party then the Civic Party.

Fei Tsui constituency is loosely based on the Hing Wah (II) Estate, Fung Wah Estate and King Tsui Court in Chai Wan with estimated population of 15,268.

Councillors represented

Election results

2010s

2000s

1990s

Notes

References

Chai Wan
Constituencies of Hong Kong
Constituencies of Eastern District Council
1994 establishments in Hong Kong
Constituencies established in 1994